The Red Sneakers is a 2002 American fantasy comedy-drama television film produced and directed by Gregory Hines. The film stars Vanessa Bell Calloway, Dempsey Pappion, and Ruben Santiago-Hudson. It premiered on Showtime on February 10, 2002.

Plot

This coming-of-age story features a mediocre high school basketball player (Dempsey Pappion) who is given a pair of magical basketball shoes by a stranger (Gregory Hines). He quickly becomes a superstar shooter on his team.  He is recruited by college basketball scouts and plans his future in college basketball, as he neglects potential academic scholarship possibilities.

Cast
 Vanessa Bell Calloway as Berniece
 Dempsey Pappion as Reggie
 Ruben Santiago-Hudson as Uncle Joe
 Scott Thompson  as Aldo
 Philip Akin as Mr. Seabrooke
 K. C. Collins as Roscoe
 Kendra FitzRandolph as Courtney
 Cabral Richards as Khalil
 Vincent D'Onofrio as Mercado
 Gregory Hines as Zeke
 Sarah Barrable-Tishauer as Larosa
 Jordan Walker as Noah Greggory
 Drew Nelson as Jacob
 Neil Crone as Coach Blake
 Reuben Thompson as Alvin Duke
 Jake Goldsbie	as Boy

Exhibition
The film premiered on Showtime Networks on February 10, 2002.

Reception

Critical response
Sara Long, with the faith based and family oriented Dove Foundation gave the film a positive review, writing, "The Red Sneakers is an enjoyable movie based around inner desires, and what one knows is right as far as actions go ... Then the movie turns around to focus on the inner battle over how to behave against what one wants, and what one should do. Though this movie does have several instances of profanity, it is nothing too severe. Because the overall content is well displayed, the film is approved for ages 12 and up.

Awards
Nominations
 Emmy Award – Outstanding Directing in a Children's Special – Gregory Hines – 2003 
 Emmy Award – Outstanding Performer in a Children's Special – Gregory Hines – 2003 
 Writers Guild of America – WGA Award (Television) – Children's Script – Mark Saltzman (teleplay) and Jeffrey Rubin (story)
 Young Artist Awards – Best Family Television Movie – Leading Young Actor – Jake Goldsbie – 2003

Film festivals
 Chicago International Children's Film Festival – 2002

References

External links
 
 

2002 films
2002 television films
2000s coming-of-age comedy-drama films
2000s fantasy comedy-drama films
2000s high school films
2000s sports comedy-drama films
2000s teen comedy-drama films
American basketball films
American coming-of-age comedy-drama films
American fantasy comedy-drama films
American sports comedy-drama films
American teen comedy-drama films
American comedy-drama television films
Fantasy television films
Films scored by Stanley Clarke
Showtime (TV network) films
Sports television films
Teen sports films
2000s English-language films
2000s American films